Shamrock is a village in the Canadian province of Saskatchewan within the Rural Municipality of Shamrock No. 134 and Census Division No. 7.

History 
Shamrock incorporated as a village on January 1, 1960.

Climate

Demographics 

References

Villages in Saskatchewan
Division No. 7, Saskatchewan